Porcellio ocellatus is a species of woodlouse in the genus Porcellio belonging to the family Porcellionidae that is endemic to mainland Spain.

References

Crustaceans described in 1879
Woodlice of Europe
Endemic fauna of Spain
Porcellionidae